The Giraffe's Neck (original title: Le Cou de la girafe) is a 2004 French-Belgian film directed by Safy Nebbou.

Cast
 Sandrine Bonnaire as Hélène
 Claude Rich as Paul
 Louisa Pili as Mathilde
 Darry Cowl as Léo
 Philippe Leroy as Maxime 
 Maurice Chevit as Maurice
 Monique Mélinand as Madeleine
 Marie Mergey as Émilie
 Geneviève Rey-Penchenat as Marguerite 
 Paul Pavel as M. Achraf
 Françoise Jamet as Lucie
 Sarah Boreo as Renée
 Arlette Didier as Josette
 Stéphane Bissot as Stéphanie
 Frédéric Gorny as L'inspecteur

References

External links
 

2004 films
French drama films
Belgian drama films
2004 drama films
2000s French-language films
2000s Spanish-language films
2000s Italian-language films
Films directed by Safy Nebbou
French-language Belgian films
2000s French films